Give Me Immortality or Give Me Death is a comedy album by the Firesign Theatre that was released in 1998 on Rhino Records. Its main theme satirizes 1990s radio formats and public hysteria over the Y2K programming bug. Give Me Immortality... is the first of the Firesign Theatre's Millenium CD trilogy We're Doomed, which includes Boom Dot Bust and Bride of Firesign.

Synopsis
The album takes the form of a fictional radio broadcast on the night of December 31, 1999. Radio Now is a FunFunTown (apparently modeled after Los Angeles, California) radio station whose format changes approximately every hour at the slightest whims of overzealous market researchers and focus groups. The album chronicles Radio Now's attempt to operate normally on the final day before the year 2000, a day riddled with apocalyptic omens, rampant computer errors, and dangerous doomsayers. The station is populated by DJ Bebop Lobo (Phil Austin), his producer Dwayne (Peter Bergman), news anchors Harold Hiphugger (David Ossman) and Ray Hamberger (Philip Proctor), sports commentator Chump Threads (Bergman), and self-help guru O'Nann Winquedinque (Austin).  Also reporting from outside the station are celebrity stalker Danny Vanilla (Ossman) and helicopter-bound traffic reporter Col. Happy Panditt (Proctor).

Themes
The album, made in 1998, lampoons the various world-threatening results which were being predicted from the Y2K bug. It also satirizes the media exploitation of the death of Diana, Princess of Wales, the Joe Camel controversy, and the Art Bell radio show.

A running gag involves eyeballs, which at one moment represent binary digits (the digit 1 resembles the letter I, a homophone of "eye", while the digit 0 is in the shape of a ball) and at other times seem to be an allusion to The Residents ("Guyz in Eyeball Hats"). Another is "U.S. Plus", an apparent multi-national conglomerate with intentionally vague commercials that hint at their all-encompassing presence ("We're U.S. Plus. We own the idea...of America!"). The urbane, sophisticated Goddess Airways commercials promise "no bloody babies" on their flights.

References to earlier Firesign Theatre albums
Used car dealer Ralph Spoilsport (Proctor), last heard in How Can You Be in Two Places at Once When You're Not Anywhere at All, appears selling used body parts in a "going out of body" sale.

Newscasters Harold Hiphugger (Ossman) and Ray Hamberger (Proctor), introduced in Everything You Know Is Wrong, work at the Radio Now station.

Caroline Presskey (Proctor), a gameshow contestant on Don't Crush That Dwarf, Hand Me the Pliers,  is heard in a telephone conversation.

Track listing
 Unconscious Village: Wake Up
 Eyeballs In The Sky
 U.S. Plus: Pork
 The Celebrity Stalker
 Sports In Your Shorts
 Ralph Spoilsport's Going Out Of Body Sale
 The News Drought Continues
 Goddess Air Presents 'Hullo, Don't Worry!'
 A Developing Chase Situation
 Pull My String 
 Princess Goddess Escapes The Celebrazzis 
 Chump Takes Some Hits
 Polar Pro: Texas Trots
 Miss Shelob's Feelin' Poorly
 Unconscious Village: Last Days Sale
 Mr. Coffee Comes Up Zeros
 Glacier 
 Gridlock At Homeless Stadium 
 Polar Ice: Party Vertical
 Going, Going, Gone á la Blonde
 Sex With My Hat
 Trippple Ripppoff
 Night Whispers 
 Bebop And Dwayne Feel No Pain 
 Smokin' Joe Says Farewell
 U.S. Plus: Zeros And Ones 
 Chump Makes A Resolution 
 The Doll Drop
 RadioNow Says Good-By And Hello

References

The Firesign Theatre albums
1998 albums
Dystopian fiction
Rhino Records albums
Science fiction comedy
1990s comedy albums